The First is a television drama series portraying a team of astronauts who prepare to become the first humans to visit Mars, created by Beau Willimon and starring an ensemble cast including Sean Penn, Natascha McElhone, LisaGay Hamilton, Hannah Ware, Keiko Agena, Rey Lucas, James Ransone, Anna Jacoby-Heron, Brian Lee Franklin, Oded Fehr, Norbert Leo Butz, Annie Parisse, Melissa George, Jeannie Berlin, and Bill Camp. The series, a co-production between American streaming service Hulu and British television network Channel 4, debuted on September 14, 2018, in the United States and on November 1, 2018 in the United Kingdom. On January 18, 2019, Hulu canceled the series after one season.

Premise
The First follows the planning of "the first human mission to Mars, while exploring the challenges of taking the first steps toward interplanetary colonization. The story focuses not only on the astronauts, but also on their families and loved ones, as well as the ground team on Earth."

Cast and characters

Main
 Sean Penn as Tom Hagerty, one of five astronauts chosen to be the first people to visit Mars.
 Natascha McElhone as Laz Ingram, the CEO of commercial launch provider Vista. Julia Badinger portrays a young Laz in a recurring role.
 Anna Jacoby-Heron as Denise Hagerty, Tom's estranged daughter struggling with drug addiction.
 Eden Grace Redfield as young Denise Hagerty in a recurring role.
 LisaGay Hamilton as Kayla Price, one of five astronauts chosen to be the first people to visit Mars. Mikaela Kimani Armstrong portrays a young Kayla in a guest appearance in the episode "Cycles".
 Hannah Ware as Sadie Hewitt, one of five astronauts chosen to be the first people to visit Mars.
 Keiko Agena as Aiko Hakari, one of five astronauts chosen to be the first people to visit Mars.
 Rey Lucas as Matteo Vega, one of five astronauts chosen to be the first people to visit Mars.
 James Ransone as Nick Fletcher, one of five astronauts chosen to be the first people to visit Mars.
 Brian Lee Franklin as Lawrence, the father of Laz Ingram.
 Oded Fehr as Eitan Hafri, the leading Vista scientist
 Norbert Leo Butz as Matthew Dawes, an astronaut killed while leading a previous mission.
 Annie Parisse as Ellen Dawes, Matthew's wife.
 Melissa George as Diane Hagerty, Tom's wife.
 Jeannie Berlin as President Cecily Burke
 Bill Camp as Aaron Shultz, a journalist.
 Ana Lucia Souza as the ballet dancer.

Recurring

 T. C. Matherne as Jason
 D. W. Moffett as Robert Cordine
 Tracie Thoms as Nancy, Kayla’s wife
 Fernanda Andrade as Camila Rodriguez
 Patrick Kennedy as Ollie Bennett, Sadie's husband
 Anthony Marble as Engineer #1
 Kelly Murtagh as Engineer #2
 Amber Patino as Amanda Ingram
 Alex Rubin as Devon Ingram
 John "Spud" McConnell as Senator Thibodeaux
 Scott Takeda as Todd
 Sharon Omi as Edith
 Miguel Najera as Mr. Castillo
 Sol Miranda as Mrs. Castillo
 Billy Slaughter as Vista Lawyer
 Cara Ronzetti as Myk
 Devyn Tyler as Samantha
 Fallon Katz as Charlotte Dawes
 Marcus Lyle Brown as Launch Director
 Galen Lee as Aiko's Son #1
 Asher Lee as Aiko's Son #2

Episodes

Production

Development
On May 3, 2017, Hulu and Channel 4 had given the production a straight-to-series order. The show was created by Beau Willimon who was also set to write for the series and executive produce alongside Jordan Tappis. Production companies involved with the series were slated to consist of Westward Productions. The series reportedly has been given a budget of around $54.6 million. On July 16, 2018, it was reported that the series would premiere on September 14, 2018 on Hulu in the United States. On October 22, 2018, it was reported that the series would premiere on November 1, 2018 on Channel 4 in the United Kingdom. On January 18, 2019, Hulu canceled the series after one season.

Casting
In September 2017, Sean Penn and Natascha McElhone were cast as the series' leads. In October 2017, it was reported that LisaGay Hamilton, Oded Fehr, James Ransone, and Hannah Ware had also joined the main cast. On November 3, 2017, Anna Jacoby-Heron was cast in a series regular role.

Filming
The series was set to finish pre-production and enter principal photography on September 18, 2017 in New Orleans, Louisiana. The shoot was scheduled to last about 85 days though it was later reported that the series would film in the city through March 9, 2018.

Release

Marketing
On July 16, 2018, a series of "first look" images from the series were released. On July 24, 2018, a teaser trailer for the series was released. On August 28, 2018, the official trailer for the series was released.

Premiere
On June 9, 2018, creator/executive producer Beau Willimon appeared at the annual ATX Television Festival where he discussed the series and debuted a "first look" at the series through a short trailer featuring narration from cast member Sean Penn. On September 7, 2018, the series took part in the 12th annual PaleyFest Fall Television Previews, which featured a preview screening of the series.

Reception

Critical response
The series has been met with a positive response from critics upon its premiere. On the review aggregation website Rotten Tomatoes, the series holds an approval rating of 68% with an average rating of 6.3 out of 10, based on 59 reviews. The website's critical consensus reads, "Sean Penn gives an intensely poignant performance as the driven but conflicted Tom Hagerty in The Firsts rather slow-moving first season." Metacritic, which uses a weighted average, assigned the series a score of 61 out of 100 based on 28 critics, indicating "generally favorable reviews."

John Anderson of the Wall Street Journal wrote: "This is not a space show, or at least it won’t be till the end of the season. But it does what it does with a high degree of intelligence. ... There’s nothing pedestrian about The First, though. It orbits high above the cable traffic."
Matt Zoller Seitz of New York Magazine notes that some have given the series negative reviews and says "Not all of the series’ risks pay off, and the overall approach is so counterintuitive that it’s bound to frustrate audiences who expected more of a problem-solving space mission story along the lines of Apollo 13 or The Martian." But gives the series a positive review saying "it weaves a spell that’s somewhere between a ’90s John Wells drama (think ER or The West Wing) and a slowed-down TV answer to Terrence Malick (The Tree of Life especially)."

Willa Paskin of Slate.com wrote: "The First is a glossy, often-inert tale of devotion and spaceflight. Its first two episodes treat inevitabilities as questions, and unfold with the zip of a DVR-ed sporting event for which you already read the box score. ... But The First does get better after its first two episodes (before getting worse again) by jettisoning inevitability. ... As flawed as I found the first season, I’ll admit, it hooked me enough that I’m interested to see how they live life on Mars."
Alan Sepinwall of Rolling Stone wrote: "The First is under no burden to be as quippy or feel-good as The Martian, as awestruck as The Right Stuff, as gee-whiz as Apollo 13 or From the Earth to the Moon. But it needs to have some compelling reason to tell this story, in this way, and it never really finds one."

Awards and nominations

See also
 Away (TV series)
 Mars (2016 TV series)

References

External links
 
 

2010s American drama television series
2018 American television series debuts
2018 American television series endings
2010s British drama television series
2018 British television series debuts
2018 British television series endings
Hulu original programming
Channel 4 television dramas
Mars in television
English-language television shows
Space adventure television series
Television series set in the 2030s
Television series about astronauts